Mustafa Itri, more commonly known as Buhurizade Mustafa Itri, or just simply Itri (1640 - 1712) was an Ottoman-Turkish musician, composer, singer and poet. With over a thousand works to his name, although only about forty of these have survived to this day, he is regarded as the master of Turkish classical music. In 2012, due to the 300th anniversary of Itri's death, the UNESCO declared 2012 the "International Itri Year".

Biography
Many things known about him today are subject to dispute. His real name was Mustafa, and he was sometimes referred to as Buhurizade Mustafa Efendi. Itri was a major exponent of Turkish classical music. He was a very prolific composer with more than a thousand works. However, only about forty of these survived to this day, the rest being lost.

It is believed that he was a Mevlevi, and composed religious music for this order. He lived through the times of five Ottoman Sultans. He became well known during  the time of Mehmet IV. He sang in fasıls, which are concert programs with the same makam, in the presence of Mehmet IV. Starting from this time, he enjoyed the support of the palace for many years. He taught music in the palace Enderun school. He was also interested in gardening. It is believed that his name Itri comes from the word itir, which means pelargonium.

As with most composers of his day, Itri was also a famous poet. He used poetic forms based on the classical Ottoman school of poetry (Divan), as well as those based on syllabic meters identified with folk music and poetry. Unfortunately most of his poetry has not survived to this day. He was also known for being a calligrapher.

Itri's portrait is depicted on the reverse of the Turkish 100 lira banknote issued in 2009.

Major works 
 Segâh Kurban Bayramı Tekbiri
 Segâh Salât-ı Ümmiye
 Dilkeşhâveran Gece Salâtı
 Mâye Cuma Salâtı
 Segâh Mevlevi Ayini
 Rast Darb-ı Türkî Naat ve Sofyan Tevşih
 Nühüft Durak; Nühüft İlahî
 Nühüft Tevşih; Nevâ Kâr
 2 Pençgâh Beste
 Hisar Devr-i Kebir Beste ve Aksak Semai
 Mâhûr Ağır Aksak Semai
 Rehavî Berefşan Beste
 Buselik Hafif Beste ve Yürük Semai
 Segâh Ağır Semai
 Segâh Yürük Semai
 Bayatî Çember Beste
 Bestenigâr Darb-ı Fetih Beste
 Dügâh Hafif Beste
 Isfahan Zencir Beste ve Ağır Aksak Semai
 Nikriz Muhammes Beste
 Râhatu'l Ervah Zencir Beste
 Irak Aksak Semai
 Rast Aksak Semai
 Nühüft Aksak Semai
 Acemaşiran Yürük Semai
 Rehavî Peşrev
 Nühüft Peşrev ve Saz Semaisi
 Nevâ Kâr

References

1711 deaths
Composers from the Ottoman Empire
Year of birth uncertain
Calligraphers from the Ottoman Empire
1640 births
Composers of Ottoman classical music
Composers of Turkish makam music
17th-century artists from the Ottoman Empire
18th-century artists from the Ottoman Empire